Cayo Romano is an island on the northern coast of Cuba, in the province of Camagüey.

Overview
Administratively is part of Nuevitas, but the closest municipality on Cuban Mainland are Esmeralda and Bolivia.

The cay is a popular for birdwatchers but is otherwise undeveloped, compared to the intensive resort developments on nearby Cayo Coco.

To the south, the Bay of Jiguey separates it from the main island of Cuba. To the north it is bordered by the Old Bahama Channel and The Bahamas to 20 miles. At the northwest corner is Cayo Paredon Grande, which has an old lighthouse. Cayo Megano Grande, Cayo Cruz as well as many reefs are developed on the northern shore. Cayo Coco is located to the north-west, and Cayo Guajaba to the south-east.

A road runs from Cayo Coco, across Cayo Romano to Cayo Paredon Grande. However, the bridge from Cayo Coco is not suitable for all vehicles.

The island of Cayo Romano was transferred to American Sugar Refining Company in 1921 by Manuel A. Cadenas y Aguilera.
The Cadenas family was well known in Camaguey society since the many years of upheaval and rebellion against Spain that occurred during many tumultuous years in Cuba history before 1900.

References

Nuevitas
Romano
Populated places in Camagüey Province
Geography of Camagüey Province